Nejad is an Iranian surname and may refer to:

Ali Nejad (born 1978), Iranian-American television poker commentator
Ezzat Ebrahim-Nejad, Iranian student, poet and demonstrator shot dead by security forces in Tehran University in 1999
Korosh Nejad, Iranian professional poker player based in London, England
Peyman Askari Nejad (born 1977), USA based Principal Structural Engineer
Qasim Ali Zahir Nejad (1303–1378), Major General in the Army of Iran after the 1357 revolution
Sharmin Meymandi Nejad, Iranian writer and director and the establisher of the Imam Ali Society
Vahid Hamdi Nejad, Iranian footballer

See also
Eslah Nejad Intersection, intersection in southern central Shiraz, Iran